Musicians plate is an ancient plate found in Tabaristan. This plate has been made in 7th century and  it is currently in the possession of the British Museum.This golden plate has been designed by silver fabrication. The musician on the far right is playing a stringed instrument which could possibly be an oud or barbat.

See also
Cyrus Cylinder

References

Archaeological discoveries in Iran
Middle Eastern objects in the British Museum
Art and cultural repatriation
Mazandaran Province
Gold objects
Silver objects